The 2003 XXXIX FIBA International Christmas Tournament "Trofeo Raimundo Saporta-Memorial Fernando Martín" was the 39th edition of the FIBA International Christmas Tournament. It took place at Raimundo Saporta Pavilion, Madrid, Spain, on 25 December 2003 with the participations of Real Madrid and Ülker.

Final

December 25, 2003

|}

References

FIBA International Christmas Tournament
2003–04 in European basketball
2003–04 in Spanish basketball
2003–04 in Turkish basketball